Stirrat may refer to:
Anthony Stirrat (born 1970), Scottish former international cyclist
Bob Stirrat, Scottish curler
Garth Stirrat (born 1956), New Zealand cricket umpire
Stirrat Johnson-Marshall (1912-1981), British architect 
Stirrat, West Virginia

See also 
 Stirratt (disambiguation)